Ender Günlü (born 9 May 1984) is a French footballer of Turkish descent, who plays as a midfielder for Sohar SC in the Omani League.

Career
Günlü started his career in the youth team of Olympique Lyonnais before moving to the Swiss lower leagues in 2003 with Étoile Carouge and then Urania Genève Sport. In 2005 Günlü moved to Spain, where he spent two years with Orihuela before joining Bursa in Turkey in 2007 and then Tunisian side EGS Gafsa in 2008. After six months with EGS Gafsa he joined Racing Club Genève for six months in January 2009 before joining Olimpik-Shuvalan for the 2009–10 Azerbaijan Premier League season. Following Günlü's stint in Bulgaria he joined Akademik Sofia for a year and then signed for Turgutluspor in January 2012. Günlü spent 5 months at Turgutluspor. In 2012 Günlü returned to the Azerbaijan Premier League, joining Turan Tovuz, appearing 27 times with 7 goals and was the best midfielder of the championship.  Günlü moved back to Turkey for the 2013–14 season with Eyüpspor, before joining Sohar SC in the Omani League for the rest of the 2014 season.

Career statistics

Honours
Étoile Carouge
1. Liga Classic: 2003–04
Orihuela
Tercera División: 2005–06

References

External links
 

French footballers
1984 births
Living people
Étoile Carouge FC players
Urania Genève Sport players
Orihuela CF players
EGS Gafsa players
AZAL PFK players
Akademik Sofia players
Turgutluspor footballers
Turan-Tovuz IK players
Eyüpspor footballers
Sohar SC players
First Professional Football League (Bulgaria) players
Expatriate footballers in Bulgaria
Association football midfielders
French people of Turkish descent
French expatriate sportspeople in Azerbaijan